George Forgie (born February 24, 1948) is a former professional Canadian ice hockey player. He was drafted first (third overall) by the Detroit Red Wings in the 1965 NHL Amateur Draft.

Playing career
Born in Winnipeg, Manitoba, Forgie played Defence for the Flin Flon Bombers of the Saskatchewan Junior Hockey League in the 1964–65 season before being drafted by the Red Wings in 1965. The Wings felt he needed more time to develop and so he would continue to play in numerous minor leagues and would unfortunately never make it into the NHL.

After playing another season for the Bombers after the draft, Forgie moved to the WCHL to play a season for Winnipeg and then moved into the EHL where he would continue his journeyman status. He played for Jacksonville Rockets, Johnstown Jets, Long Island Ducks, and finally the Jersey Devils in 1970. Forgie played his final days of hockey with the Transcona Chargers of the Central Senior Hockey League in 1977.

Awards
 (EHL) Most games played in one season (82 in 1968–69)

External links
 George's info on Hockey Draft Central.com

1948 births
Living people
Canadian ice hockey defencemen
Detroit Red Wings draft picks
Flin Flon Bombers players
National Hockey League first-round draft picks
Ice hockey people from Winnipeg